Aurora is a 2018 Filipino horror thriller film written and directed by Yam Laranas and starring Anne Curtis. It serves as an official entry to the 2018 Metro Manila Film Festival and marks Curtis' third and last film of 2018, following her box-office hits Sid & Aya: Not a Love Story and BuyBust. The film is inspired by the 1987 disaster of [[MV Doña Paz#1987 collision with MT Vector|MV Doña Paz'''s collision with MT Vector]].

Premise
The story follows Leana (Curtis) who lives peacefully in the island with her younger sister Rita. Everything changes when a ship named Aurora crashes near their vicinity. Rita has an ability to see dead people, but every time she sees them, disastrous and catastrophic events occur. Leana must then protect the young girl at any cost before it is too late. The film was partially inspired by the sinking of the Philippines' MV Doña Paz''.

Cast
Anne Curtis as Leana
Marco Gumabao as Ricky
Mercedes Cabral as Delia
Allan Paule as Eddie
Andrea Del Rosario as Cecile
Phoebe Villamor as Rita
Arnold Reyes as Philip
Ricardo Cepeda as Coast Guard
Ruby Ruiz as Mrs. Castro
Sue Prado as Mrs. Amado

References

External links
 
 

2018 films
Philippine horror thriller films
2018 horror thriller films
Viva Films films
Films set in Aurora (province)
Films shot in Aurora (province)
Films set on ships
Films directed by Yam Laranas